Peter Dembicki (born 24 September 1980 in Vancouver, British Columbia) is a Canadian rower.

References 
 

1980 births
Living people
Canadian male rowers
Rowers from Vancouver
World Rowing Championships medalists for Canada
21st-century Canadian people